Gary Gardner (born 29 June 1992) is an English professional footballer who plays as a central midfielder for  club Birmingham City.

A product of the Aston Villa Academy, Gardner made his senior debut while on loan at Coventry City. He first played competitively for Aston Villa in late 2011, and went on to spend time on loan at Sheffield Wednesday, Brighton & Hove Albion, Nottingham Forest, Barnsley and Birmingham City, before joining Birmingham on a permanent contract in 2019.

He has made a number of appearances at under-age levels for England, including five for England U21. He is the younger brother of Birmingham City technical director Craig Gardner.

Club career

Aston Villa

Youth career
Gardner started his career at Aston Villa with older brother Craig. His development was interrupted by an anterior cruciate ligament (ACL) injury sustained in December 2009. On his return, he became an important member of Aston Villa's under-18 and reserve sides.

Gardner scored twice in Aston Villa reserves' 10–1 win over Arsenal on 10 January 2011, firstly catching out Gunners' goalkeeper James Shea to break the deadlock before scoring another from the penalty spot. He also claimed assists for Andreas Weimann's and Jonathan Hogg's goals. The midfielder first played for Aston Villa's first team in a pre-season friendly, coming on as a substitute for captain Stiliyan Petrov in the 2011 Barclays Asia Trophy final loss to Chelsea.

He also represented Aston Villa in the inaugural season of the NextGen series, a European competition for younger footballers similar in format to the UEFA Champions League. During the group stage, Gardner scored single goals against Fenerbahçe and Rosenborg. In Villa's last group match, Gardner scored all three goals in a 3–0 victory over Ajax. He scored a last-minute equaliser in the quarter-final match against Marseille, but Villa went on to lose the tie 2–1 in extra time. Gardner's six goals made him the competition's joint second-highest goalscorer that year and the highest-scoring midfielder, alongside Rosenborg's Mushaga Bakenga and Betinho of Sporting CP.

Senior debut
Gardner joined Coventry City in later November 2011 on a month's loan. He scored just 9 minutes into his début in a 2–1 defeat against Brighton & Hove Albion on 26 November. After making four appearances for the Sky Blues in the Championship in his first 28 days, Gardner was recalled by his parent club who were suffering injury problems.

On 31 December, Gardner made his first senior appearance for Villa in a 3–1 away win at Chelsea, as a 78th-minute substitute for Marc Albrighton. He came off the bench again a week later as Villa beat Bristol Rovers in the third round of the FA Cup, and made his first start on 21 January 2012, in a 3–2 win away at Wolverhampton Wanderers. Gardner maintained his place in the team as the season progressed due to major injury concerns and the illness of captain Stiliyan Petrov.

Gardner suffered another ACL injury in August 2012, this time in his right knee. He returned to the Villa first team as an unused substitute against Chelsea on 11 May 2013 and made his playing comeback on the final day of the season against Wigan Athletic.

Loan spells
He made four starts for Sheffield Wednesday during a month's loan in February and March 2014, and signed a two-year contract with Villa at the end of the season.

Over the course of those two years, Gardner made no further appearances for Villa but spent three spells out on loan at Championship level. He played 20 matches in all competitions for Brighton & Hove Albion in the first half of the 2014–15 season and scored twice, a winner against Wigan Athletic in early November that broke a 12-match winless run and took Albion out of the relegation places, and a goal in a 1–1 draw with Blackburn Rovers a few days later. Gardner spent the second half of the season at Nottingham Forest, scoring 4 goals from 18 league appearances; he "thundered home a 30-yard drive via the bar" against Reading in February that was voted Sky Sports News' #goaloftheday. On his return, he was offered and signed a three-year contract. Gardner returned to Forest for the second half of the 2015–16 season, scoring twice from 22 appearances.

Return to Villa and more loans
After Villa's relegation from the Premier League, Gardner became a regular member of their first-team squad. He made 26 Championship appearances for the club in the 2016–17 season, and scored his first senior goal for Villa on 30 October to open the scoring against local rivals Birmingham City. According to BBC Sport's reporter, he "ran the length of the field to celebrate with 1,988 away fans after superbly heading the visitors in front", but the match ended as a 1–1 draw. The arrival of several midfielders pushed him out of contention for the first team, and at the end of August 2017 he joined Championship club Barnsley on loan for the remainder of the 2017–18 season. He made 29 league appearances and scored twice, in a 3–2 win against Sheffield United on 7 April and a 2–2 draw with Bolton Wanderers a week later, as Barnsley were unable to avoid relegation.

Gardner joined yet another Championship club, Birmingham City, on 9 August 2018 on loan for the 2018–19 season. He made his debut in the starting eleven for the 2–0 defeat away to Reading in the EFL Cup first round, and retained his place for the rest of the season. He missed only four matches: those against his parent club, for which he was ineligiblealthough Birmingham did ask Villa if they would allow him to participatethe 3–3 draw with Hull City in November for which he was suspended, and the final match of the season, when several first-team regulars were left out.

Birmingham City 
Gardner signed a three-year contract with Birmingham City on 5 June 2019. On the same day, Jota moved in the opposite direction; the fees were undisclosed.

International career
Gardner has played for England at numerous international levels, including under-17s, under-18s, under-20s and the under-21s.

On 10 November 2011, Gardner came on as a substitute, replacing Jason Lowe in the 62nd minute, and scored his first two goals for the England under-21s against Iceland under-21s.

Personal life
Gardner is the brother of fellow professional footballer Craig Gardner, also a product of the Aston Villa youth system. The siblings contribute funds to a boxing gym in their home town of Birmingham, which was featured on an episode of Soccer AM in 2011.

Career statistics

Honours
Individual
 Birmingham City Players' Player of the Season: 2021–22

References

External links

Gary Gardner profile at the Aston Villa website

England profile at the FA

1992 births
Living people
Sportspeople from Solihull
English footballers
Association football midfielders
Aston Villa F.C. players
Coventry City F.C. players
Sheffield Wednesday F.C. players
Brighton & Hove Albion F.C. players
Nottingham Forest F.C. players
Barnsley F.C. players
Birmingham City F.C. players
English Football League players
Premier League players
England youth international footballers
England under-21 international footballers